Robert William Rinder (8 December 1878 – 13 June 1956) was an Australian rules footballer who played with St Kilda in the Victorian Football League (VFL).

References

External links 

1878 births
1956 deaths
Australian rules footballers from Victoria (Australia)
St Kilda Football Club players